Martyn may refer to:
Martyn (surname), one of the Tribes of Galway and others
Martyn (given name)

See also
Martin (disambiguation)
Marten (disambiguation)
Martin of Tours